Naia or NAIA may refer to:

Sports
 National Association of Intercollegiate Athletics
 NAIA Softball Championship
 NAIA Volleyball Championship
 NAIA World Series
 NAIA Wrestling Championship
 NAIA lacrosse

Other
 Naia (skeleton), a Paleoamerican skeleton
 National Animal Interest Alliance, an animal welfare organization in the United States
 North American Institute of Aviation, flight school in Conway, South Carolina
 Ninoy Aquino International Airport, serving Metro Manila, Philippines
 NAIA Expressway (E6)
 NAIA Road (N194)